2997 Cabrera, provisional designation , is an asteroid from the central regions of the asteroid belt, approximately 8 kilometers in diameter.

It was discovered by the Felix Aguilar Observatory at Leoncito Astronomical Complex, Argentina, on 17 June 1974. It orbits the Sun in the central main-belt at a distance of 2.0–3.1 AU once every 4 years and 1 month (1,492 days). Its orbit has an eccentricity of 0.20 and an inclination of 7° with respect to the ecliptic.

It is named after Argentine astronomer Ascención Cabrera (1917–2003), long on the staff of the La Plata Observatory and collaborator at the Argentine National Observatory.

References

External links 
 Dictionary of Minor Planet Names, Google books
 
 

002997
002997
Named minor planets
19740617